Karmel Kandreva (1931–1982) was an Arbëresh writer and poet.

He was born in Cerzeto (Qanë) in Calabria, Italy. Among his published works is a study Didactic test in a bilingual Arberesh environment, about the right of the Arberesh people to cultivate their own language and to have it taught at schools.

He also published several poetical volumes.

Bibliography
Didactic test in a bilingual Italo-Albanian environment (1979)
Spirit of Arbër is alive (1976)
Spirit of Arbërs is alive: Albanian-Arberesh narrates II (1977)
Spirit of Arbër is alive: ancient branch suffers III (1979)

References

1931 births
1982 deaths
Italian people of Arbëreshë descent
Albanian-language writers
People from the Province of Cosenza
20th-century Italian poets
20th-century Albanian poets
Albanian male poets
Italian male poets
Albanian-language poets
20th-century Italian male writers